Smolsko may refer to:
 Smolsko, Sofia Province, Bulgaria
 Smólsko, Łobez County, Poland
 Smólsko, Myślibórz County, Poland